Olf or OLF may refer to:

 Office québécois de la langue française, Canada
 Ohio LinuxFest, technology conference in the U.S.
 Ontario Linux Fest, technology conference in Canada
 Oromo Liberation Front, a nationalist political party in Oromia, Ethiopia.
 Our Lady of Fatima High School, Aligarh, India
 Outlying Landing Field, a type of airfield used by the U.S. Navy
 Olf (unit), odor emission measurement unit
 Oldfield Park railway station (National Rail station code OLF), Bath, Somerset, UK
 L. M. Clayton Airport (IATA airport code OLF), Montana, U.S.
 Norwegian Oil Industry Association